The 2020–21 Biathlon World Cup (BWC) was a multi-race series over a season of biathlon, organised by the International Biathlon Union. The season started on 28 November 2020 in Kontiolahti, Finland and ended on 21 March 2021 in Östersund, Sweden.

Starting from this season a blue bib will be introduced for the best biathlete under the age of 25.

Calendar 

Below is the IBU World Cup calendar for the 2020–21 season.

Calendar changes 
 On 28 September the rounds originally scheduled at Östersund, Sweden and Le Grand-Bornand, France were replaced by additional rounds at Kontiolahti, Finland and Hochfilzen, Austria respectively.
 On 5 October it was announced that Oberhof will host two events, replacing Ruhpolding.
 A round which was set to be held in Beijing as test event for the 2022 Winter Olympics was replaced on 23 November with another round at Nové Město.
 On 13 February the round originally scheduled at Oslo-Holmenkollen, Norway was replaced by additional rounds at Östersund, Sweden.

World Cup podiums

Men

Women

Men's team – 4x7.5 km Relay

Women's team – 4x6 km Relay

Mixed Relay

Standings (men)

Overall 

Final standings after 26 races.

Under 25 

Final standings after 26 races.

Individual 

Final standings after 3 races.

Sprint 

Final standings after 10 races.

Pursuit 

Final standings after 8 races.

Mass start 

Final standings after 5 races.

Relay 

 Final standings after 6 races.

Nation 

Final standings after 25 races.

Standings (women)

Overall 

Final standings after 26 races.

Under 25 

Final standings after 26 races.

Individual 

Final standings after 3 races.

Sprint 

Final standings after 10 races.

Pursuit 

Final standings after 8 races.

Mass start 

Final standings after 5 races.

Relay 

Final standings after 6 races.

Nation 

Final standings after 25 races.

Standings: Mixed

Mixed relay 

 Final standings after 6 races.

Medal table

Points distribution 
The table shows the number of points won in the 2020/21 Biathlon World Cup for men and women. Relay events do not impact individual rankings.

Achievements 

 First World Cup career victory

Men
  Sturla Holm Lægreid, 23, in his 2nd season — Stage 1 Individual in Kontiolahti; it also was his first podium
  Sebastian Samuelsson, 23, in his 5th season — Stage 2 Pursuit in Kontiolahti; first podium was 2018–19 Sprint in Oberhof
  Johannes Dale, 23, in his 3rd season — Stage 3 Sprint in Hochfilzen; it also was his first podium
  Martin Ponsiluoma, 25, in his 4th season — World Championships Sprint in Pokljuka; first podium was 2018–19 Sprint in Nové Město
  Simon Desthieux, 29, in his 9th season — Stage 8 Sprint in Nové Město; first podium was 2017–18 Sprint in Tyumen

Women
  Dzinara Alimbekava, 24, in her 4th season — Stage 3 Sprint in Hochfilzen; it also was her first podium
  Lisa Theresa Hauser, 27, in her 8th season — Stage 7 Individual in Antholz-Anterselva; first podium was 2020–21 Sprint in Oberhof
  Ingrid Landmark Tandrevold, 24, in her 5th season — Stage 10 Mass Start in Östersund; first podium was 2018–19 Mass Start in Ruhpolding

 First World Cup podium

Men
  Sturla Holm Lægreid, 23, in his 2nd season — no. 1 in the Stage 1 Individual in Kontiolahti
  Johannes Dale, 23, in his 3rd season — no. 1 in the Stage 3 Sprint in Hochfilzen
  Felix Leitner, 24, in his 5th season – no. 2 in the Stage 6 Mass Start in Oberhof
  Eduard Latypov, 26, in his 3rd season – no. 2 in the Stage 10 Mass Start in Östersund

Women
  Johanna Skottheim, 26, in her 5th season — no. 3 in the Stage 1 Individual in Kontiolahti
  Karoline Offigstad Knotten, 25, in her 3rd season — no. 3 in the Stage 1 Sprint in Kontiolahti
  Elvira Öberg, 21, in her 2nd season — no. 3 in the Stage 2 Sprint in Kontiolahti
  Dzinara Alimbekava, 24, in her 4th season — no. 1 in the Stage 3 Sprint in Hochfilzen
  Lisa Theresa Hauser, 27, in her 8th season - no. 3 in the Stage 5 Sprint in Oberhof
  Hanna Sola, 24, in her 3rd season — no. 3 in World Championships Sprint in Pokljuka

 Victory in this World Cup (all-time number of victories in parentheses)

Men
  Sturla Holm Lægreid, 7 (7) first places
  Johannes Thingnes Bø, 4 (51) first places
  Tarjei Bø, 3 (12) first places
  Quentin Fillon Maillet, 3 (6) first places
  Simon Desthieux, 2 (2) first places
  Arnd Peiffer, 1 (10) first place
  Alexandr Loginov, 1 (3) first place
  Lukas Hofer, 1 (2) first place
  Émilien Jacquelin, 1 (2) first place
  Sebastian Samuelsson, 1 (1) first place
  Johannes Dale, 1 (1) first place
  Martin Ponsiluoma, 1 (1) first place

Women
  Tiril Eckhoff, 13 (26) first places
  Marte Olsbu Røiseland, 3 (9) first places
  Hanna Öberg, 2 (5) first places
  Julia Simon, 2 (3) first places
  Lisa Theresa Hauser, 2 (2) first places
  Dorothea Wierer, 1 (12) first place
  Markéta Davidová, 1 (2) first place
  Dzinara Alimbekava, 1 (1) first place
  Ingrid Landmark Tandrevold, 1 (1) first place

Retirements 
The following notable biathletes retired during or after the 2020–21 season:

Men
  
  Vladimir Oryachkov
  Giuseppe Montello
  Arnd Peiffer
  Simon Schempp
  Ondřej Moravec
  Anton Pantov
  Lars Helge Birkeland
  Marcin Schweinos
  Anatoliy Oskin
  
  Lukas Ottinger

Women
  Stefani Popova
  Desislava Stoyanova
  Nika Blazenic
  Anna Tkadlecova
  Nicole Gontier
  Alina Raikova
  Anna Frolina
  Krystyna Guzik
  Irina Starykh
  Ekaterina Shumilova
   Lea Einfalt
  Aneta Smerciakova

Notes

References

External links 

 IBU official site

 
Biathlon World Cup
2020 in biathlon
2021 in biathlon